Promises is the second full-length album by Canadian rock band The Hunters. The album was released on April 17, 2012 on Stomp Records, their first on a record label.

The first single, "Van Party Forever" was released on June 5 and the music video features the band playing with The Sainte Catherines during their farewell tour.

The second music video is made entirely of shots from their journey to The Fest 11 in Gainesville. It was filmed during Hurricane Sandy and features the band driving all the way from Florida to Québec in a rental car as all flights were cancelled. It was released on November 27, 2012.

A documentary webseries about Promises promotional tour was released in January 2013. Titled Driving on Promises, the ten episodes cover the whole tour through Quebec and Ontario. It is based on their roadie's log book.

The album was recorded and produced by Hugo Mudie and Marc-André Beaudet, both from The Sainte Catherines.

Track listing

Personnel
The Hunters
 Dominic Pelletier – lead vocals, guitar, harmonica
 Danahé Rousseau-Côté – guitar
 Raphaël Potvin – bass guitar, vocals
 William Duguay-Drouin – drums, percussion, piano

Production
 Produced by Hugo Mudie, Marc-André Beaudet and The Hunters
 Mixed and engineered by Marc-André Beaudet; assisted by Hugo Mudie
 Mastered by Ryan Morey

Art
 Front and back picture by Alexandra Quinn
 Artwork and layout by Jimmi Francoeur
 Art direction by Jimmi Francoeur, Hugo Mudie and The Hunters

References

2012 albums
The Hunters (band) albums